The Playmates were an American late 1950s vocal group led by the pianist Chic Hetti (born Carl Cicchetti, 26 February 1930), drummer Donny Conn (born Donald Claps, 29 March 1930 – September 2, 2015), and Morey Carr (31 July 1932 – 1987), all from Waterbury, Connecticut, United States.

Career
The Playmates—Donald Claps (a.k.a. Donny Conn), drummer and lyricist; Carl Cicchetti (a.k.a. Chic Hetti), pianist music composer; and Morey Cohen (a.k.a. Morey Carr), lead vocalist—were an instrumental and vocal trio, from Waterbury, Connecticut, and, in the early 1950s, at the University of Connecticut. After graduation in 1952, they began touring small lounges and night clubs in the United States and Canada, originally as "the Nitwits", later as the Playmates.

Signed to Roulette Records in 1958 as the label's first vocal group, and anticipating a Calypso craze, the group recorded an album called Playmates Visit the West Indies. They then released two notable Top 40 singles — "Jo-Ann" and "Don't Go Home" — before having a number 4 hit (July 9, 1958) with the tempo-changing novelty song "Beep, Beep", which became a regular feature for Dr. Demento.

The "Beep, Beep" song was on the Billboard Top 40 chart for twelve weeks. It sold more than one million copies, and was awarded a gold disc. Concurrently with the popularity of "Beep Beep", American Motors Corporation (AMC) was setting production and sales records for the Rambler models. Because of a directive by the BBC at the time that songs did not include brand names in their lyrics, a version of "Beep Beep" was recorded for the European market, replacing the Cadillac and Nash Rambler with the generic terms limousine and bubble car.

The group followed up with a chart listing single in 1959 with "What Is Love" and then again in 1960 with "Wait For Me". After four albums for Roulette, the novelty group — known for its between-song comedy and banter as much for its repertoire — broke up in 1965. Morey Carr died from lung cancer in 1987. Donald Claps died in Malibu, California, on September 2, 2015 at the age of 85.

Discography
Charted singles (U.S.) / 45 rpm.
(Release Month/Year), Title, (Label), Billboard Chart peak
 (January, 1958), "Jo-Ann" (Roulette), #19
 (April, 1958), "Let's Be Lovers" (Roulette), #87
 (June, 1958), "Don't Go Home" (Roulette), #22
 (September, 1958), "The Day I Died" (Roulette), #81
 (November, 1958), "Beep Beep" (Roulette), #4
 (March, 1959), "Star Love" (Roulette), #75
 (July, 1959), "What Is Love" (Roulette), #15
 (October, 1960), "Wait for Me" (Roulette), #37
 (March, 1961), "Little Miss Stuck-Up" (Roulette), #70
 (July, 1962), "Keep Your Hands in Your Pockets" (Roulette), #88
 

Album
 At Play with the Playmates (1958)
Side one
 "Jo-Ann" – 2:35
 "Your Love" – 2:09
 "Darling It's Wonderful" – 2:35
 "Substitute for Love" – 2:13
 "Magic Shoes" – 2:10
 "While the Record Goes Around" – 2:10
Side two
 "Beep Beep" – 3:01
 "The Day I Died" – 2:20
 "Give Me Another Chance" – 2:25
 "Lovable" – 2:16
 "Intimate" – 2:20
 "Don't Go Home" – 2:30

References

External links
 

American novelty song performers
Musical groups established in 1958
Musical groups disestablished in 1964
Apex Records artists
Roulette Records artists
1958 establishments in Connecticut